Pectinimura crinalis is a moth in the family Lecithoceridae. It is found on Palawan province of the Philippines.

The wingspan is 14.5-15.5 mm. The forewings are yellowish brown, speckled with dark-fuscous scales. The hindwings are greyish brown.

Etymology
The species name is derived from Latin crini (meaning hair).

References

Moths described in 2008
crinalis